John Andrew Mara (July 21, 1840 – February 11, 1920) was a Canadian merchant, rancher and a politician at both the provincial and federal levels.

Mara was elected to the Legislative Assembly of British Columbia in the province of British Columbia.  He sat in the provincial legislature as the member from Yale.  He ran for election as well as sat as both Government and Opposition - this was before political parties were allowed in the House. Federally, Mara was a Conservative and was twice acclaimed as a Member of Parliament in the federal riding of Yale before being defeated by Hewitt Bostock in the 1896 election in the new riding of Yale—Cariboo.

Mara's greater claim to fame (or infamy) is the alleged seduction and pregnancy of Annie McLean, the sister of the "Wild McLean Boys".  The McLeans were the halfbred children of the former HBC factor at Kamloops, Donald McLean, who had died in the Chilcotin War.  Mara's alleged outrage of their sister led to the McLean brothers' bloody rampage across the Nicola Country and the death of provincial magistrate and gold commissioner Johnny Ussher.

Mara owned the large ranchlands between Enderby and Sicamous where the Okanagan and Shuswap countries meet.  Mara Mountain east of the original ranch, and Mara Lake south of Sicamous, bear his name. Today Mara Lake Provincial Park on Mara Lake is now a popular tourist destination during the summer months. The village of Mara still exists south of Mara Lake along the Shuswap River.

Mara's wife Alice was the daughter of Frank Barnard, founder of the Barnard's Express Co. or "B.X.".  Her brother, and therefore Mara's brother-in-law, was Sir Francis Stillman Barnard, 10th Lieutenant-Governor of British Columbia (1914–1919).

References

External links
 

1840 births
1920 deaths
Politicians from Toronto
Canadian civil servants
Gold commissioners in British Columbia
Conservative Party of Canada (1867–1942) MPs
Members of the House of Commons of Canada from British Columbia
Speakers of the Legislative Assembly of British Columbia
Canadian ranchers